Ecotorq is a heavy duty diesel engine family primarily used in Ford Cargo heavy duty trucks, designed and built by Ford Otosan. Ecotorq is the first diesel engine which is completely built with CAD/CAM technologies in Turkey. Ecotorq family is produced in Ford Otosan's truck and engine transmission plant located in İnönü, and JMC Xiaolan engine plant in Nanchang, China under license of Ford Otosan. 

The Ecotorq engine has been developed along the second generation Ford Cargo (H298) heavy duty truck, which is a in-house project of Ford Otosan. First generation of Ecotorq engine made its debut in 2003. It replaces the Ford Dorset/Dover series water-cooled turbodiesel engine and competes for the Turkish local market with Cummins B and C series engines used in various BMC trucks, and with Mercedes-Benz and MAN heavy duty engines.

Ecotorq is built two different generations by its debut. Unlike its predecessor, all generations of Ecotorq engine are mounted on the axis of the chassis rather than Dover series engines are mounted with angle, watercooled and 24-valve valvetrain architecture.

First Generation 
First generation of Ecotorq engines made its debut in 2003 along the Ford Cargo (H298) with 7.3L displacement.

Applications 
Automotive applications with all generations of Ecotorq include the following:

See also 
 Ecotorq Engine Family

References

Ecotorq engine
Straight-six engines
Diesel engines by model